Prasid Jantum (born April 30, 1995) is a Thai professional footballer who plays as a central midfielder for Thai League 1 club PT Prachuap.

International career
Prasid was part of Thailand U19's squad in the 2014 Hassanal Bolkiah Trophy.

References

External links

livesoccer888.com
goal.com

1995 births
Living people
Prasid Jantum
Prasid Jantum
Prasid Jantum
Association football midfielders
Prasid Jantum
Prasid Jantum